Caiza "D" is a village located in the José María Linares Province in the Potosí Department of Bolivia.

References

External links 

Populated places in Potosí Department